Social Manias are mass movements which periodically sweep through societies. They are characterized by an outpouring of enthusiasm, mass involvement and millenarian goals.  Social Manias are contagious social epidemics, and as such they should be differentiated from mania in individuals.

Social Manias come in different sizes and strengths.  Some social Manias fail to 'catch fire', while others persist for hundreds of years (although sometimes in severely attenuated form). Common to all is a vision of salvation, a new way of life, which if realized would radically change everyday life, ushering in a new world of freedom and justice.

Examples
The Taiping Rebellion is an excellent illustration, as it was both widespread and destructive and has no modern adherents to whom its use as an example would be a distraction. The Ghost dance which was briefly embraced by Native Americans of the Great Plains in 1890 is another excellent example which may be viewed in some historical perspective, as may The Crusades. Almost any form of religion could be argued to be a long-standing social mania, many of which have persisted through thousands of years.

See also
Moral panic

References

Further reading
 Jessica Stern, Terror in the Name of God: Why Religious Militants Kill, Harpercollins, August, 2003, hardcover, 400 pages, 

Social movements
Social phenomena
Mass psychogenic illness